The Diocese of New Ulm is a Latin Church ecclesiastical territory or diocese of the Catholic Church in western Minnesota, United States. It is a suffragan diocese in the ecclesiastical province of the metropolitan Archdiocese of Saint Paul and Minneapolis. The see for the diocese is New Ulm. The Cathedral parish is the Cathedral of the Holy Trinity. It encompasses the counties of Big Stone, Brown, Chippewa, Kandiyohi, Lac qui Parle, Lincoln, Lyon, McLeod, Meeker, Nicollet, Redwood, Renville, Sibley, Swift, and Yellow Medicine in Minnesota.

The diocese has a very rural nature.  The largest town in the diocese is Willmar at 19,610; New Ulm is, after Hutchinson and Marshall, the 4th largest city. There are no Catholic colleges or universities situated in the diocese.

History
The diocese was founded on November 18, 1957, by Pope Pius XII.  Its territory was taken from the Archdiocese of Saint Paul.

Sexual abuse and bankruptcy
On March 29, the diocese released the names of 16 clergy, 13 of whom were by then deceased, who were "credibly accused" of sexually abusing minors. In April 2016, three more priests were added to the list. On March 3, 2017, the diocese filed for Chapter 11 Bankruptcy following numerous lawsuits surrounding sex abuse by Catholic clergy in the area. New Ulm follows the Duluth Diocese and the Archdiocese of St. Paul and Minneapolis, which both filed for bankruptcy in 2015, thus making Minnesota the first state in the United States of America to have three Catholic dioceses filed for bankruptcy. At the time of its bankruptcy, 21 priests who served in the Diocese of New Ulm were credibly accused of sexually abuse, with the majority of accusations stemming from the 1950s to 1970s.  The lawsuits against the diocese accused approximately 90 priests of sexually abusing 101 victims. In June 2019, it was agreed that 93 of these victims would receive $34 million as part of a settlement. The settlement was approved by a bankruptcy judge in March 2020.

Bishops

Bishops of New Ulm
The list of bishops of the diocese and their terms of service:
 Alphonse James Schladweiler (1957–1975)
 Raymond Alphonse Lucker (1975–2000)
 John Clayton Nienstedt (2001–2007), appointed Coadjutor Archbishop and later Archbishop of Saint Paul and Minneapolis
 John M. LeVoir (2008–2020)
 Chad Zielinski (2022-)

Other priest of this diocese who became Bishop
 John Jeremiah McRaith, appointed Bishop of Owensboro in 1982

High schools
Cathedral High School, New Ulm
Holy Trinity High School, Winsted
St. Mary's High School, Sleepy Eye

See also

 Catholic Church in the United States
 Ecclesiastical Province of Saint Paul and Minneapolis
 List of the Catholic dioceses of the United States

Notes

External links
Diocese of New Ulm Official Site

 
New Ulm
Diocese of New Ulm
Christian organizations established in 1957
New Ulm
New Ulm
Companies that filed for Chapter 11 bankruptcy in 2017